List of magazines published in Scotland is an incomplete list of magazines and comics published in Scotland.

There are over 700 magazines currently being published in Scotland, by nearly 200 organisations, with an estimated total turnover of £157m per annum.

The Scots Magazine, first published in January 1739, is the oldest magazine in the world still in publication, although there have been several gaps in its publication history. The Dandy, first published on 3 December 1937, is currently the longest running comic in the world. Both of these titles are owned by DC Thomson of Dundee, a major publisher of newspapers and periodicals.

Contemporary

Magazines

Gaelic language

 An Gaidheal Ur (The New Gael)

Scots language

 Lallans, bi-annual journal from the Scots Language Society

Lifestyle and general interest
Scottish Field
The Big Issue in Scotland
bunkered
Five Star Magazine
My Weekly
The People's Friend
Scotsgay
Shout
The Weekly News

Literature, arts and entertainment
Chapman, literary
Clash, youth
The Drouth, the arts
Edinburgh Review
is this music?, Scottish alternative/independent music
Lines Review 1952–1998, poetry magazine published by Callum Macdonald (1912–1999)
The List, entertainment in Edinburgh and Glasgow
M8, entertainment in Edinburgh and Glasgow
Prospect, architecture
Scotcampus, entertainment and culture for students
The Skinny, music, film, culture and arts in Dundee, Edinburgh and Glasgow
Variant, nominally arts and culture; emphasis on society and politics

Politics
Cencrastus
Common Sense
Emancipation and Liberation
Frontline
Harpies and Quines
Holyrood
Scottish Left Review
Tait's Edinburgh Magazine

Religion
Life and Work, Church of Scotland

Scottish interest
The Scots Magazine

Comics and children's magazines

DC Thomson
The Beano
Commando
The Dandy
Oor Wullie

Other
Metaphrog

Defunct

Magazines
Harpies and Quines

Comics and children's magazines

DC Thomson
The Beezer (1956–1993)
Bullet (1976–1978)
Buzz (1973–1975)
Cracker (1975–1976)
Hoot (1985–1986)
Jackie (1964–1993)
Nutty (1980–1985)
Plug (1977–1979)
Sparky (1965–1977)
Starblazer
The Topper (1953–1990)
The Victor
Warlord

Other
Electric Soup (1989–?)
Louis by metaphrog (2000–present)
Northern Lightz (1999–2004)

No longer published in Scotland
The following magazines were once published in Scotland, but are now published elsewhere:

The Celtic View, still written and produced in Glasgow, but now (since 2005) published by CRE8 of Oxfordshire, England

See also
Carn, published in the Isle of Man, but sold in Scotland and the other Celtic countries
List of DC Thomson publications
List of Scottish Gaelic periodicals
Media in Scotland

References

Magazines published in Scotland, list
Scotland
Scotland